The Vale do Sinos Regional Development Association, VALETEC, was established in 1998 as a non-profit private civil partnership at the Sinos River Valley in southern Brazil. Its goal is to promote technological development in the Vale do Sinos region by stimulating regional integration, providing incentives for entrepreneurship, while creating, attracting, hosting, and developing companies. In order to achieve this goal, VALETEC develops and manages environments for technological innovation, such as incubators, entrepreneurial condominiums, technology parks and complexes, as well as other initiatives aligned with this focus. VALETEC's main commitment is to contribute for the improvement of the Vale do Sinos quality of life, while forging links between educational and research institutions and the society, governments, and companies. This contributes to generate jobs and wealth, boosting the sustainable development of the Vale do Sinos technopolitan project.

One of VALETEC's main initiatives was the creation of the Vale do Sinos Technology Park, VALETEC Park. The park currently works as a regional, multicampi and multisector enterprise, with its main axis following the path of highways RS-239 and BR-116, the Innovation Route. The first segment of the VALETEC Park was launched in the city of Campo Bom, in December, 2004. The second segment will consist of an urban park, to be established within the Hamburgo Velho's Historical Center, in the city of Novo Hamburgo. The park currently encompasses important educational institutions, research centers, labs, companies with intensive focus on knowledge, advanced services, incubators, entrepreneurial centers, facilities for the installation and expansion of companies, living areas and rooms for shared use.

The VALETEC Park is ready to host entrepreneurs, new or consolidated companies and institutions that develop or plan on developing clean technology, applied to the following priority areas: agriculture, animal husbandry, and agribusiness; automation and informatics; biotechnology; leather and footwear industry; design; energy; environment; telecommunications; and creative economy. In the city of Campo Bom, the park segment has capacity for over 120 companies, research centers, scientific and economic development organizations, and advanced service providers. The park's initially encompasses an area of 365,000 m², surrounded by lovely sceneries, a result of our deep respect for the environment. The surroundings have been keeping up with the park's growth. This is the result of the expansion and diversification of existing companies, along with the creation of spaces to host new business models and new areas for companies to operate in.

Companies can be installed in the Campo Bom segment of the VALETEC Park under three different modalities: inside the Feevale's Technology Incubator, ITEF, for pre-incubation and incubation; in business accelerators and business condominiums, such as the Alberto Santos Dumont Business Center and the Montserrat Business Condominium; and in individual facilities, which companies may choose to either purchase or rent. Feevale is a regional community university (public, yet not state-owned) which operates in the Campo Bom segment of the VALETEC Park through its Academic Extension Center. This is a space for learning, research and extension activities, with an auditorium, event hall, meeting rooms, restaurant and areas for partners and advanced service providers. In the surroundings of the Academic Extension Center, there are several green preservation areas which make perfect spots for relaxing outdoors, with plenty of shadow to contemplate nature and exercise creativity.

Innovation Route 
The Innovation Route represents the VALETEC Park's main axis. It is located along the path of highways RS-239 and BR-116, and its initial project encompasses eight cities. After the Campo Bom segment was established, an opportunity to expand the park was envisioned. This was motivated by the fact that the city's master plan has, since the 1960s, been preserving a minimum of 350 meters on each side of highway RS-239 exclusively for business use. The project received resources from the Research and Projects Financing, FINEP, the Brazilian Innovation Agency, a division of the Ministry of Science and Technology, in order to plan, develop, and implement the best practices identified by VALETEC during its international missions. The studies performed made it possible to identify several advantages that ensured the VALETEC Park's success as a regional enterprise.

Members 
One of the VALETEC's stylemarks is shared management through a network of alliances. Companies that associate to VALETEC also become members of the VALETEC Park, and have access to a wide range of advantages, such as a relationship network that enables them to develop cooperative projects and receive financial funding for innovation. In addition, members have access to the shared infrastructure and high added value services, along with the possibility of establishing relationships with associated educational and research institutions.

Buildings and structures in Rio Grande do Sul
Novo Hamburgo
Science parks in Brazil